Oberlin is a ghost town in Eden Township, Licking County, in the U.S. state of Ohio.

History
Oberlin was founded about 1856 and at first was centered on a general store.

References

Geography of Licking County, Ohio
1856 establishments in Ohio
Populated places established in 1856
Ghost towns in Ohio